Clive Aslet (born 15 February 1955) is a writer on British architecture and life, and a campaigner on countryside and other issues. He was for many years editor of Country Life magazine. He is Visiting Professor of Architecture at the University of Cambridge and publisher of Triglyph Books.

Early life
Aslet was educated at King's College School in Wimbledon and Peterhouse, Cambridge, where he earned a degree in the history of architecture.

Career
After graduating, he joined Country Life magazine in 1977 as architectural writer, becoming architectural editor in 1984, deputy editor in 1989, and editor-in-chief in 1993. In 1997 he was named British Society of Magazine Editors' Editor of the Year. After 13 years as editor-in-chief, from 13 March 2006, Aslet left and took on a newly created role of editor-at-large, leading Country Lifes public relations activities and acting as an editorial consultant and writer for the magazine, as well as writing more books and doing freelance articles for newspapers such as The Daily Telegraph, the Daily Mail, and The Sunday Times, and broadcasts on radio and television current affairs programmes including Newsnight.

Books
Aslet is the author of:

The Last Country Houses (Yale University Press, 1982). Paperback edition 1985
Quinlan Terry: The Revival of Architecture (Viking, 1986)
The National Trust book of the English house (with Alan Powers; Penguin, 1985)
Deuce of an Uproar: William Eden Nesfield's Letters to the Rector of Radwinter in Essex (Friends of Radwinter Church, 1988)
Knight Frank & Rutley's Buying a Country House: A County Guide to Value (Country Life, 1989)
The American Country House (Yale University Press, 1990). Paperback, 2005
The American Houses of Robert A.M. Stern (with Robert A.M. Stern; Rizzoli International Publications, 1991)
Countryblast (with Michael Heath; John Murray, 1991)
Anyone for England? (Little, Brown; 1997)
Inside the House of Lords (with Derry Moore) (HarperCollins, 1998)
The Story of Greenwich (Fourth Estate, 1999)
A Horse in the Country: Diary of a Year in the Heart of England (Fourth Estate, 2001). Paperback, 2002
Landmarks of Britain: The Five Hundred Places That Made Our History (Hodder & Stoughton Ltd, 2006)
The English House (Bloomsbury Publishing, 2008)
Villages of Britain (Bloomsbury Publishing, 2010)
War Memorial (Viking, 2012)
An Exuberant Catalogue of Dreams: The Americans who Revived the Country House in Britain (Aurum Press, 2013) 
The Birdcage (Cumulus, 2014)
 Old Homes, New Life: The resurgence of the British country house (Triglyph Books, 2020) 
The Story of the Country House (Yale University Press, 2021)

Publications
The best buildings in Britain: a catalogue of grade 1 buildings and grade A churches in England, category A buildings in Scotland and Western Isles, grade 1 buildings and grade A churches in Wales / compiled by Iain Clark, Clive Aslet and Louise Nicholson; edited by Roger Coppen (Save Britain's Heritage, c1980)
Enchanted Forest: The Story of Stansted in Sussex (by The Earl of Bessborough, with Clive Aslet, Weidenfeld & Nicolson, 1984)
A history of Elveden (Christie, Manson & Woods Ltd, Sale catalogue, 1984)

References

External links
Official website

1955 births
Living people
People educated at King's College School, London
New Classical architecture
English architecture writers
English historians
Alumni of Peterhouse, Cambridge
Country Life (magazine) people